This is a list of fellows of the Royal Society elected in 1919.

Fellows
Janne Robert Rydberg  (1854 -1919)
Francis Arthur Bainbridge  (1874 -1921)
Marie Ennemond Camille Jordan  (1838 -1922)
Jacobus Cornelius Kapteyn  (1851 -1922)
Sir Maurice Fitzmaurice  (1861 -1924)
Theodore William Richards  (1868 -1928)
Thomas Barlow Wood  (1869 -1929)
John William Evans  (1857 -1930)
William Diller Matthew  (1871 -1930)
Bertram Dillon Steele  (1870 -1934)
George Barger  (1878 -1939)
Charles Gabriel Seligman  (1873 -1940)
Edward Heron-Allen  (1861 -1943)
Thomas Hunt Morgan  (1866 -1945)
Simon Flexner  (1863 -1946)
Francois Antoine Alfred Lacroix  (1863 -1948)
George Stuart Graham-Smith  (1875 -1950)
Sir Charles Frederick Arden-Close  (1865 -1952)
Sergius Winogradsky  (1856 -1953)
Robert Williams Wood  (1868 -1955)
John Christopher Willis  (1868 -1958)
George Neville Watson  (1886 -1965)
Sydney Chapman  (1888 -1970)
Edward VIII "King of Great Britain, Ireland, and the British Dominions beyond the seas, Emperor of India" (1894 -1972)
Sir Geoffrey Ingram Taylor  (1886 -1975)

References

1919
1919 in science
1919 in the United Kingdom